Shaheen Bano (born 10 September 1945), known professionally as Zeba, is a Pakistani actress. She was one of the top stars of the Pakistani film industry in the 1960s and the early 1970s. She was voted among 25 of the greatest actors of Asia in a 2010 CNN poll.

Early life
Zeba's family migrated to Pakistan from India when she was only 3 years old. She received her basic education in Pakistan. She made her screen debut in film Chiragh Jalta Raha in 1962. During a career that spanned almost three decades, Zeba appeared in numerous commercially successful as well as critically appreciated films, many of which featured her alongside actor and husband Mohammad Ali. She also starred in the 1966 film Arman which was produced by actor and producer Waheed Murad, Pakistan's first Platinum jubilee film.

Career
In 1961, producer Noor Mohammad Khan offered her a role of heroine in his film Zindagi but later, due to unknown reasons, film was shelved. By then, she accepted a role in another film Shakir. Arif was the hero, and the movie was eventually released in 1962 with a different name Chiragh jalta raha. Other debut cast were Mohammad Ali and Kamal Irani. Her second release of 1962, Jab say dekha hai tumhain, opposite Darpan earned her critical success. Her next film, Baaji was released in 1963 which was also successful.

Her first release of 1964 Taubah was a Golden Jubilee movie. Her pair, first with Kamal and then with Waheed Murad, who was the only producer at that time from Karachi. Her second collaboration with Waheed Murad was in 1964 film Heera aur pathar. Her next three successive releases in 1964, Aashiana, Baghi Sipahi and Head Constable.

After the introduction of color movies, she first appeared in Najma. Rishtah hey pyar ka was her first film which was shot overseas. Her first release of 1966 was Armaan which was also Pakistan's first Platinum Jubilee Urdu film. Armaan was produced by Waheed Murad himself and directed by Pervaiz Malik. The movie was released on 18 March 1966. She won her first Best Actress award from Nigar Awards for this film. During the same year, Zeba and Waheed Murad were teamed up in two other movies, i.e., Josh and Jaag utha insaan. From 1965 to 1969 Zeba worked in a number of films. Some of her notable and successful films of that time are Eid Mubarak (1964), Kaneez, Dard-e-Dil, Koh-e-Noor, Josh, Suhagan, Taj Mahal, Anjaan, Mohabbat rang laye gi, Ek Phool ek Pathar and Bahoo Rani. In 1970, she played a young-to-old role in Shabab Kiranvi's film Insaan aur Aadmi. Her performance was greatly appreciated and she won her second Best Actress award from Nigar Awards.

One of her most memorable role came in 1972 film Mohabbat which was a critical and commercial success and earned her the third Best Actress award from Nigar Awards.

She starred in only one Punjabi film named Mehndi wale hath, even though she had worked with a total of 45 film directors over her entire career.

She along with Mohammad Ali also worked in 1989 Hindi movie Clerk written, produced, directed by and starring Manoj Kumar alongside an ensemble cast including Rekha, Anita Raj, Shashi Kapoor, Rajendra Kumar, Ashok Kumar, Prem Chopra and Sonu Walia. This was her only Hindi film appearance.

Zeba reportedly told a major newspaper of Pakistan in 2021, "I'm not complete without Ali. He was a good husband, a great father and a good friend."

Films with Mohammad Ali
By the late 1970s, Zeba started to work opposite her husband only. Known as a couple 'Ali-Zeb' in the media, the pair did a number of movies together. Some of their most notable films are: 
 Chiragh jalta raha (1962) – This was a debut movie for both of them
 Aag (1967)
 Jaise Jante Naheen (1969)
 Baharein Phir Bhi Aaeingee
 Dil Diya Dard Liya (1968)
 Najma
 Afsana Zindagi Ka (1972)
 Mohabbat (1972)
 Aurat Ek Paheli
 Naukar 
 Mohabbat Zindagi Hai
 Jab Jab Phool Khile
 Phool Mere Gulshan Ka
 Daman Aur Chingari (1973)

Her last film was Mohabbat Ho Tau Aesi released in 1989 was also with Mohammad Ali.

Personal life
Her first marriage was to Khawaja Rehmat Ali (1959–1962), and her second to Sudhir (1964–1966). Although Zeba had met Mohammad Ali on the set of their debut film Chiragh jalta raha (1962) but their affection for each other was rekindled on the set of film Tum mile pyar mila (1966), and they married while the film was still under production on 29 September 1966. The couple remained married until Ali's death from heart attack on 19 March 2006.

Zeba had a daughter from her first marriage named Samina, after marrying Mohammad Ali, he legally adopted Samina, giving her the name Samina Ali.

Awards and recognition
 Hilal-i-Imtiaz (Crescent of Excellence) Award in 2016 by the President of Pakistan

She received the Nigar Awards three times in her movie career:

 Nigar Award for Best Actress in film Armaan in 1966 
 Nigar Award for Best Actress in film Insaan Aur Aadmi in 1970 
 Nigar Award for Best Actress in film Mohabbat in 1972

She had also received two special awards from Nigar Awards [Millennium award in 1999] and [Ilyas Rashidi gold medal in 2002].

Filmography

1962
 Chiragh Jalta Raha 
 Jab se dekha hai tumhen

1963
 Baaji
 Dil ne tujhe maan liya
 Sumeera
 Mehndi wale hath (Punjabi)

1964
 Taubah
 Aashiyanah
 Heera aur pathar
 Head constable
 Baghi Sipahi

1965
 Kaneez
 Eid Mubarak
 Aisa bhi hota hai
 Rawaaj
 Tere shehar mein

1966
 Armaan
 Josh
 Koh-e-Noor
 Lori
 Tasveer
 Jokar
 Dard-e-Dil
 Jaag utha Insaan

1967
 Insaniyat
 Ehsaan
 Rishta hai pyar ka
 Maa Baap
 Aag
 Suhagan
 Waqt ki pukar

1968
 Mafroor
 Baalam
 Adalat
 Pakeeza
 Asmat
 Mujhe jeeney do
 Mahal
 Dil diya dard liya
 Taj Mahal

1969
 Tum mile pyar mila
 Jaise jante nahin
 Zindgi kitni haseen hai
 Bahu Rani
 Jang-e-Azadi

1970
 Insaan Aur Aadmi
 Mohabbat rang laye gi
 Ik Phool ik Pathar
 Anjaan
 Najma
 Noreen

1971
 Insaaf Aur Qanoon
 Duniya na maney
 Yaden
 Teri soorat meri Ankhen
 Salam-e-Mohabbat
 Aansoo bahaye Pathron ne

1972
 Afsana Zindgi ka
 Ilzaam
 Sabbaq
 Mohabbat
 Badley gi Duniya saathi
 Dil ik Aaina

1973
 Daaman aur Chingari
 Nadiya ke paar

1974
 Phool Mere Gulshan Ka
 Tiger Gang
 Shama
 Parchhaen

1975
 Jab Jab Phool Khile (Pakistani film)
 Noukar
 Bin Baadal Barsat
 Aarzoo
 Mohabbat Zindagi Hai (1975 film)
 Sheerin Farhad
 Gumrah
 Palki
 Isar

1976
 Aurat ek paheli
 Phool aur Sholay
 Goonj uthi Shehnai
 Dharkan
 Aap ka Khadam

1977
 Bharosa

1978
 Kora Kaghaz
 Takrao

1979
 Chori Chori
 Ibadat

1989
 Clerk
 Mohabbat ho to aisi

See also 
 List of Lollywood actors

References

External links
 

Zeba
Zeba
Nigar Award winners
Punjabi people
Punjabi women
20th-century Pakistani actresses
1945 births
Recipients of Hilal-i-Imtiaz